Denali Park Depot is a seasonal passenger railroad station located within Denali National Park. It is adjacent to the visitor center located in Denali Park. The station offers service for the Alaska Railroad's Denali Star route between mid-May and Mid-September.

References

External links
 

Alaska Railroad stations
Buildings and structures in Denali National Park and Preserve